Mountain Tracks: Volume 2 is a progressive bluegrass live album by the Yonder Mountain String Band. It was released August 20, 2002 by SCI Fidelity, a Boulder-based independent record label.

The album was recorded and compiled from three different live performances in Boulder, Colorado, Portland, Oregon, and Eugene, Oregon. It is the second volume of the Mountain Tracks live series.

The song "Goodbye Blue Sky" by Pink Floyd is performed as a hidden song after "Follow Me Down to the Riverside".

Track listing 

 "At the End of the Day" (Jeff Austin) – 4:38
 "Dawn's Early Light" (Austin) – 11:05
 "Two Hits and the Joint Turned Brown" (John Hartford) – 3:37
 "Raleigh and Spencer" (Traditional) – 5:26
 "Good Hearted Woman" (Waylon Jennings, Willie Nelson) – 4:03
 "No Expectations" (Mick Jagger, Keith Richards) – 10:02
 "Peace of Mind/ Follow Me Down to the Riverside/ Peace of Mind" (Austin) – 27:18
 "Untitled" (Goodbye Blue Sky); 3:49

Personnel

Yonder Mountain String Band 

 Dave Johnston – banjo, vocals
 Jeff Austin – mandolin, vocals
 Ben Kaufmann – bass, vocals
 Adam Aijala – guitar, vocals

Technical 

 David Glasser – mastering
 Bob Stovern – CD layout
 James Tuttle – mixing

References

External links 
 Yonder Mountain String Band Official Homepage

Yonder Mountain String Band albums
2002 live albums